This is a list of episodes from the fourth season of Shark Tank.

Episodes

References

External links 
 Official website
 

4
2012 American television seasons
2013 American television seasons